Food studies is the critical examination of food and its contexts within science, art, history, society, and other fields. It is distinctive from other food-related areas of study such as nutrition, agriculture, gastronomy, and culinary arts in that it tends to look beyond the  consumption, production, and aesthetic appreciation of food and tries to illuminate food as it relates to a vast number of academic fields. It is thus a field that involves and attracts philosophers, historians, scientists, literary scholars, sociologists, art historians, anthropologists, and others.

State of the field 
This is an interdisciplinary and emerging field, and as such there is a substantial crossover between academic and popular work.  Practitioners reference best-selling authors, such as the journalist Michael Pollan, as well as scholars, such as the historian Warren Belasco and the anthropologist Sidney Mintz.  While this makes the discipline somewhat volatile, it also makes it interesting and engaging.  The journalist Paul Levy has noted, for example, that "Food studies is a subject so much in its infancy that it would be foolish to try to define it or in any way circumscribe it, because the topic, discipline or method you rule out today might be tomorrow's big thing."

Research questions 
Qualitative questions that are wrestled with include: What impact does food have on the environment?  What are the ethics of eating?  How does food contribute to systems of oppression? How are foods symbolic markers of identity?  At the same time practitioners may ask seemingly basic questions that are nonetheless fundamental to human existence.  Who chooses what we eat and why?  How are foods traditionally prepared—and where is the boundary between authentic culinary heritage and invented traditions?  How is food integrated into classrooms? There are also questions of the spatialization of foodways and the relationship to place. This has led to the development of the concept of "foodscape" – introduced in the early 1990s – and the related practice of foodscape mapping. Discussion of these questions has increased as a result of public concern about issues which have arisen as a result of the emergence of a vast array of novel food technologies throughout the last century, ranging from chemical fertilizers to GMOs. Pursuers of food studies approach these questions by first understanding the scientific, economic, and philosophical issues surrounding them.

Institutions 
One branch of this community has organized itself as The Association for the Study of Food and Society.  This group hosts an annual conference (along with the Agriculture, Food, and Human Values Society); it publishes an interdisciplinary journal, Food, Culture, and Society; and it maintains an email listserv with over a thousand members for discussion of food-related topics. ASFS maintains a list of institutions granting food studies related degrees.

A few schools have programs in the field, including Julia Child and Jacques Pepin founded Boston University's  Gastronomy Masters program and New York University's program in Nutrition, Food Studies, and Public Health. The Department of Anthropology at Indiana University has recently started a food studies concentration within their program, leading to a PhD in Anthropology, while The New School is developing an undergraduate program in Food Studies.  Prof. Fabio Parasecoli is the Coordinator of Food Studies at the New School in New York City.

Indiana University began offering a PhD track in Food Anthropology in 2005, and an undergraduate minor in the anthropology of food in 2007, followed quickly by the IU Geography Department, which now also offers an MA and PhD in food systems. In 2016 the Collins Living-Learning center at IU started offering an undergraduate certificate in Food and Sustainability. At the same time the University has established the IU Food Institute, to house a growing interdisciplinary Food Studies research group, chaired by Profs. Peter Todd and Richard Wilk.

Syracuse University offers a Bachelor of Science or minor in food studies at the undergraduate level and a Masters of Science or Certificate of Advance Study (CAS) at the graduate level. With a systems perspective grounded in political economy, food studies at Syracuse University is a full stand-alone program with dedicated faculty, a dynamic and devoted group of students, a physical home – including extensive teaching kitchens, community partners including farms, food businesses, government agencies, and not-for-profit organizations, complementary programs on campus, and a growing list of professional contacts nationwide.

Chatham University Master of Arts in Food Studies. The Masters of Arts in Food Studies emphasizes a holistic approach to food systems, from agriculture and food production to cuisines and consumption, providing intellectual and practical experience from field to table. Prof. Alice Julier is the Coordinator of Food Studies at Chatham University. The University of Oregon in Eugene, US, has recently launched a graduate specialization in food studies, and is aiming for a 2014 launch of an undergraduate degree.

University of the Pacific, San Francisco has the only Master of Arts in Food Studies program on the West Coast.  It is multidisciplinary and the curriculum encompasses food history, food writing, food production, food scarcity and justice, and food industry management and business.  In addition to graduate seminars, faculty leads field visits to area restaurants, farms and food processing facilities.  Ken Albala, a food historian and director of program is the author or editor of 23 scholarly and popular books on food.  He writes, "Our goal is to engage students in the dynamism that is the Bay Area food and farming scene, while making connections with leaders throughout the food system."

In Italy, the American University of Rome  offers a US-accredited 15-month Master in Food Studies with a strong international dimension focused on the linkages between food and the environment and policies for sustainable production, consumption and diets.

The Technological University Dublin, Ireland (previously Dublin Institute of Technology), offers a Master of Arts in Gastronomy and Food Studies that focuses on three pillars: History, Society and Practice. The two-year part-time programme – first of its kind in Ireland – features masterclasses, workshops, guest speakers, field trips and meal experiences and includes such courses as Global Cultural History of Food, Politics of the Global Food System, Food Writing and Media, History of Irish Food, Reading Historic Cookbooks, Social Approaches to Wine and Beverage Culture, Food Tourism, and Consumer Culture and Branding.

In the United Kingdom, SOAS, University of London has offered a master's programme in the Anthropology of Food since 2007. The course offers students the opportunity to study food on a variety of levels, ranging from the domestic to the international. The institution is also home to the SOAS Food Studies Centre, an interdisciplinary research centre focused on furthering the academic study of food.

In France, since 2000, at University of Toulouse Jean Jaures, ISTHIA, Toulouse School of Tourism, Hospitality and Food Studies (Institut Supérieur du Tourisme, de l'Hôtellerie et de l'Alimentation) offers a Master's programme in Food Social Sciences Applied to Food. This multidisciplinary programme encompasses sociology, anthropology, economy, psychology, history, geography, public health nutrition, food system organisation... This master is linked with the research group SANTAL (Health and Food) of CERTOP a mix unit of CNRS where students can follow in PhD in sociology. It was founded and directed for more than 15 years by Jean Pierre Poulain, a French food sociologist and anthropologist.

Queen Margaret University in Edinburgh, Scotland, has launched a master's degree in Gastronomy. This is a unique qualification and the first of its kind in Scotland, which allows students to engage with the broad range of issues connected with food, provenance, diet, health, and nutrition. The degree is not just about food, but also delves deeper to consider food culture within the contexts of anthropology, environment, sustainability, politics and communications.

Even study abroad programs have created new, interdisciplinary food studies programs, among them Palazzo Rucellai in Florence and The Umbra Institute in Perugia.  Gustolab International is another institution which offers research internships and courses in sustainable production and consumption, food and media, food waste, advertising, science and nutrition, new technologies, and the history of food in Italy, Japan and Vietnam. To be mentioned also is the Pollenzo-based (near Bra, Cuneo, Italy) University of Gastronomic Sciences, the Institut Européen d'Histoire et des Cultures de l'Alimentation (of Tours, France, mentioned above) and FOST: Social and Cultural Food Studies of the Vrije Universiteit Brussel (Belgium), providing education in bachelor, master or postgraduate studies.

Numerous presses publish academic and popular books about the cultural significance of food, some of which are Columbia University Press, University Press of Mississippi, the University of Nebraska Press, University of California Press, the University of Illinois Press, the MIT Press, Bloomsbury Academic, Rowman & Littlefield, Berg, Earthscan, Routledge, Prospect, and Equinox Publishing.

Food insecurity and health outcomes 
In America, almost 50 million people are considered food insecure. This is because they do not have the means to buy healthy food, therefore, lead an unhealthy lifestyle. At least 1.4 times more children who are food insecure are likely to have asthma, compared to food-secure children. And older Americans who are food-insecure will tend to have limitations in their daily activities. When a household is lacking the means (money) to buy proper food, their health ultimately suffers. Supplemental Nutrition Assistance Program (SNAP, formerly known as the Food Stamp Program) is put in place to help families in need to get the proper nutrition they need in order to live a healthy lifestyle. There are three points that make a household eligible for SNAP. One is their gross monthly income must be 130% of the federal poverty level. The second point they have to meet is being below poverty. Finally, they have to have assets of less than $2,000 except that households with at least one senior and households that include at least one person with a disability can have more assets. Multiple studies have shown SNAP as being successful in reducing poverty.

The major part of this research was examining children's food insecurity, the effect of this have greatly affected a child's performance. Due to food insecurity also runs the risk of possibly birth defects "5 anemia, 6,7 lower nutrient intakes, 8 cognitive problems, 9 and aggression and anxiety." As opposed to children in food-secure households, "children in food-insecure households had 2.0-3.0 times higher odds of having anemia, 6, 7 2.0 times higher odds of being in fair or poor health, 8 and 1.4–2.6 times higher odds of having asthma, depending on the age of the child."

Non senior adult had less research done on them in regards with the impacts of food insecurity "however, some of the studies in this limited set have shown that food insecurity is associated with decreased nutrient intakes; 20-25 increased rates of mental health problems and depression,10,26-30 diabetes, 31, 32 hypertension, 33 and hyperlipidemia; 32 worse outcomes on health exams; 33 being in poor or fair health; 23 , 34 and poor sleep outcomes 35." Mothers who are food insecurity tend to be twice as likely to report mental health issues as well as oral health problems.

Food and education
Food and school are two interconnected topics. Children spend a large part of their day in school, so the food that is served in and around school greatly influences eating habits. Fast food in particular has proven to affect school children's health. Fast food marketing targets children. In the United States, more than 13 million children and adolescents are obese. Obesity prevalence was 13.9% among 2- to 5-year-olds, 18.4% among 6- to 11-year-olds, and 20.6% among 12- to 19-year-olds. The close proximity of fast food restaurants to schools has been speculated be one of the reasons for such high childhood obesity. In California, students with fast food restaurants within a half mile from their schools are more likely to be overweight, and are less likely to eat healthier foods. Fast food restaurants are also concentrated around schools in Chicago, increasing the risk of poor food choices for school children there. Research has shown that at least 80% of schools in Chicago have at least one fast food restaurant 10 minutes away. The close proximity of fast food restaurants to schools exposes US children to unhealthy, cheap meals that they can easily get to and from school, increasing the chances of childhood obesity.

The influence of food on school children can also be a positive thing. Schools are being used to advocate for obesity prevention, since nutrition has been proven to be linked to academic performance. The overweight students do not perform as well academically, and also deal with health related issues that take away from school time. To combat this, schools are working to help their students. 83% of public and private schools provide breakfast and lunch programs that serve nutritious food up to federal standards, and these programs are proven to be beneficial for students' nutrition.

The prevalence of competitive foods in schools are still providing students with unhealthy foods. Competitive foods are the foods that are for sale to students besides the federal meals. Usually these foods are high in fat and sugar, and access to vending machines allows for students to have sugary drinks as well. A 2003 California High School Fast Food Survey found that about one-fourth of 173 districts served brand name fast food from Subway, Domino's, Pizza Hut, and Taco Bell. These foods are reached for more than the healthier options.

Parents and the public have raised concerns about the health impacts of the competitive food in schools. Healthier food costs schools more to buy, so the concern of losing revenue influences the purchase of cheaper, less healthy options. Even so, schools in Maine, California, Minnesota, and Pennsylvania were able to replace sugary drinks with healthier options without losing revenue.

School nutrition programs have also helped fight poor eating habits of students with the support of parents and school administrators. Making it Happen! School Nutrition Success Stories is a program that provides healthier alternative foods to schools. Schools have been doing their part by changing food contracts, promoting better eating, and fundraising for better student health.

Food industry and economy 
The food industry has a rapid rate of increasing sectors such as restaurants and fast food places that impact the economy in the long and short run. There are many people involved behind a successful business. In the food industry, the workers that are involved include servers, waiters, chefs, farmworkers and all restaurant workers. The issue is that some of these workers are paid minimum wage for all the effort they put in. The work individuals do involves picking fruits and vegetables that are served in the meal, they make the food, serve it to the consumers and wash dishes. These workers deal with working conditions, aspirations and labor practices. But these workers specifically have to deal with poor working conditions such as unsanitary kitchens which affect the food that is served to the consumers and can negatively impact their health.

This allows the society to see from the perspective of how the workers and their relationship to the food can be demonstrated as multiple meanings for them because they live off of it. These people include immigrant restaurant owners and mobile food vendors. Ellen Kossek and Lisa Burke did a research on "Developing Occupational and Family Resilience in US Migrant Farm Workers" which explained how the migrant workers in the agriculture industry face tough circumstances in their work and home environment. The other conditions besides low work wages include difficult working conditions, health problems, not well suited housing, family issues and children's lives impacted negatively. These conditions are categorized as 'acculturative stress' but the goal is to maintain a healthy and better life which does not have a negative impact on family relations and job performance. One of the findings from the research was that the farm work mothers who had an infant in the Migrant Head Start Program, those ladies performed better in their household and at work.

There can be programs developed as a solution to the problem with the goal of improving social networks for the migrant farmworkers and better education systems for the children. The benefits of creating these programs will help in improving work, childcare and housing conditions for farmworkers and their families. The issue is that they have to move constantly based on the season because there are limited opportunities. Another study was done by Saru Jayaraman and Sean Basinski who focused on this issue. In "Feeding America: Immigrants in the Restaurant Industry and Throughout the Food System Take Action for Change", they provide data which looks at the working conditions and poverty rates that affect the workers. There were efforts made by Restaurant Opportunities Centers United to better wages, benefits and opportunities to advance. These studies allow us to see the workers experiences and the conditions they deal with. Our goal should be to get involved and make a healthy and sustainable industry.

See also 

 Agriculture
 Agribusiness
 Anthropology of food
 Culinary art
 Food choice
 Food preferences in older adults and seniors
 Food science
 Foodways
 Gastronomy
 List of food and drink magazines
 Nutrition
 Sociology of food

References

Further reading 

 McIntosh Alex, 1996, Sociologies of Food and Nutrition. Environment, Development, and Public Policy, Springer, 

 Pollan, Michael. In Defense of Food: An Eater's Manifesto. New York: Penguin Press, 2008.
 Pollan, Michael. The Omnivore's Dilemma: A Natural History of Four Meals. New York: Penguin Press, 2006.
 Poulain, Jean Pierre, 2017, The Sociology of Food: Eating and the Place of Food in Society, Bloomsbury,
 Sutton, David. 2001. Remembrance of Repasts: An Anthropology of Food and Memory. Oxford: Berg.
  
 Wilk, Richard, ed. Fast Food/Slow Food: The Cultural Economy of the Global Food System. Walnut Creek: Altamira Press, 2006.
 
 Yasmeen, G. Bangkok's Foodscape, Bangkok: White Lotus, 2006.

External links 
 Agriculture, Food & Human Values Society
 The Association for the Study of Food and Society

Food science